The  is a subcompact car that was manufactured in Japan by Toyota from 1999 until 2005, when it was replaced by the Belta. Designated by Toyota as the XP10 series, the Platz was also sold in export markets as either the Toyota Yaris or Toyota Echo. The "Yaris" and "Echo" names were also given to the export version of the related Japanese market Vitz hatchback, from which the Platz derives. In Japan, it was available at the Toyopet Store and the Netz Toyota Store dealerships.

Etymology 
The name "Platz" is German for "space" (as defined by "the interior room is spacious"). Only straight-four engines were fitted to the Platz, which was sold in Japan as a four-door sedan only. A coupé version was also available in North America where the car was badged "Echo".

History 
The Platz was introduced in 1999 as a sedan sold internationally, with a coupé version exclusive to North America following for the 2000 model year. The Platz is closely related to the Vitz hatchback with which it shares front doors, a common interior and mechanical componentry. The running gear is also shared to a lesser degree with the ist and bB, sold in the United States as the Scion xA and xB respectively, and the JDM-only WiLL Vi. The same platform is the base for the JDM-only Probox and Succeed wagons.

In the United States, the Echo sold almost 50,000 units in its first year, with just half that many in 2003. The Echo was an element of Toyota Project Genesis, a failed effort to bring younger buyers to the marque in the United States. The Echo sold in high volumes in Canada, where Toyota also offered the three- and five-door hatchback versions of the Vitz badged as the Echo beginning with the 2004 model year to replace the Echo coupé (which was dropped after 2003). The coupé remained on sale in the United States until the 2005 model year along with the sedan, while the hatchback variants were never sold there. It was the predecessor to the current North American Yaris, sharing many identical features, such as the odd (and somewhat controversial) center placement of the speedometer and gauges, as opposed to in front of the steering wheel. Power options on the Echo are a rare find; most models are equipped with manual windows and locks, air conditioning, and a six-speaker audio system with a CD and/or a cassette player.

Xiali 2000/Vela 

In China, the Platz was marketed as the Xiali 2000 from December 2000 to March 2004. The car was then lightly facelifted and renamed as the Xiali Vela, which sold from March 2004 to 2012. It came with the 1.3-litre 8A-FE, 1.5-litre 5A-FE or a 1.6-litre Chinese-made engine known as the CA4GB2. A five-speed manual gearbox was standard on all models. From 2002 to 2003, a limited edition model was sold the Xiali Yaku and available with a 4-speed automatic gearbox.

Safety 
The 2010 edition of Monash University's Used Car Safety Ratings (UCSR), found that the XP10 provides a "poor" (two out of five stars) level of occupant safety protection in the event of an accident.

Sales

References 

Platz
Cars introduced in 1999
2000s cars
Subcompact cars
Sedans
Coupés
Front-wheel-drive vehicles
All-wheel-drive vehicles